The College of the Resurrection, popularly known as Mirfield, is an Anglo-Catholic theological college of the Church of England in Mirfield, West Yorkshire, England.

The college was founded in 1902 and describes itself as "A Theological College like no other". The college has close links to the Community of the Resurrection. It trains men and women in the Anglo-Catholic tradition for the priesthood.

Daily life
All resident students are expected to attend Matins and Evensong six days a week. On most days the college says Matins and celebrates Low Mass in the college chapel and joins the Community of the Resurrection to sing Evensong. Saturday is the normal day off each week when there are no obligations. On Sundays, students are expected to join the community for Matins and the Solemn Mass. 

The college and community of the Resurrection   maintain liturgical worship in the Catholic tradition using vestments and incense. 
Later in the morning, students normally go to a local parish church as part of their pastoral formation.

Single students live at the college, married students in nearby houses owned by the college. The married-student houses range in size from two to four bedrooms and none are more than a ten-minute walk from the college.

University of Durham
The college, along with YTEP, began a new relationship with the University of Durham in 2020. This partnership provides a variety of learning programmes, from the Common Awards to a variety of masters programmes.

Yorkshire Theological Educational Partnership

The Yorkshire Theological Educational Partnership (formerly Ministry Course YMC), was established in 1970 as the North West Ordination Course. It was renamed in 1980 as the Northern Ordination Course. It took students from the dioceses of Chester, Blackburn, Liverpool and Manchester. It opened dialogue with the College of the Resurrection in 1996, establishing an Eastern arm in Yorkshire at the College of the Resurrection.

In 2008 as a result of the reconfiguration subsequent to the Hind Report, the Northern Ordination Course separated from its Manchester base remaining established at Mirfield. It was then renamed the Yorkshire Ministry Course and became located on the Mirfield site along with the college, centre and community. Now, the rebranded YTEP department serves the Dioceses of Leeds, of Sheffield and of York.

Programmes

The following programmes are offered in partnership with the University of Durham:

BA (Honours) in Theological Studies
Normally three years full-time, but candidates who have a good honours degree in a subject other than theology, or the equivalent of Level 1 in theological study, may be admitted to the degree at Level 2 and so complete the course in two years.

MA in Ministry and Theology
One year full-time, two years part-time or three and a half years on a professional development pathway. This is available for ordination candidates and others who have a 2.1 or above in a first degree (BA or equivalent) in theology/religious studies. Humanities, social science or other subjects are considered, where the applicant can show evidence of relevant experience, background or private study in theology.

MA in Ministry and Biblical Studies
One year full-time, two years part-time or three and a half years on a professional development pathway. This programme allows students to draw on the expertise of the Department of Biblical Studies at Durham, while following a programme of study that maintains a focus on the practice of ministry.

MA in Liturgy
One year full-time, two years part-time or three and a half years on a professional development pathway. This programme allows students to focus their studies on liturgy, while still offering the opportunity to draw from other areas of theology and biblical studies.

Research degrees: MA by Research, MPhil, PhD
Candidates may apply via the college for a research degree of the University of Durham, provided that appropriate supervision can be arranged either at the college or in the Department of Biblical Studies at the university.

Ecumenism
The college has had a long relationship with other Christian traditions, accepting students from many denominations outside of the Anglican Communion. Here are some examples:
An annual scholarship for graduate students of the Romanian Orthodox Church.
Student exchanges between Mirfield and the Lutheran Theological Institute in Sibiu.
Helping to found the Romanian Orthodox parish of Saint Macarios the Great, Mirfield, in 2004.
Accepting students from the Lutheran Church of Sweden.
Accepting both Roman Catholic seminarians and Methodist students for ordination on exchange visits from their own colleges.
Accepting students and priests from the Oriental Orthodox Church.
Working closely with the Armenian Apostolic Church.

Teaching staff 
 The Reverend Dr Dorothea Bertschmann – Academic Dean, Lecturer in Biblical Studies
 The Reverend Fr Tony Carroll – Lecturer in Ethics
 The Reverend Fr David Babbington - Dean of Pastoral Studies
 The Reverend Dr Jo Kershaw - Lecturer in Liturgy
 The Right Reverend Mark Sowerby - Principal

List of principals

Notable alumni

 Donald Arden – Archbishop of Central Africa
 Patrick Barron – Bishop of George, South Africa
 Tom Butler – Bishop of Southwark
 Richard Coles – musician, radio presenter and parish priest
 John Crook – Bishop of Moray, Ross and Caithness
 John Flack – Bishop of Huntingdon
 Anselm Genders CR – Bishop of Bermuda
 Jonathan Greener – Dean of Exeter
 Thomas Hannay – Primus of the Scottish Episcopal Church
 John Hannen – Bishop of Caledonia, Canada
 James Hughes – Archbishop of Central Africa
 Luke Irvine-Capel - Archdeacon of Chichester
 John Maund – Bishop of Lesotho, South Africa
 Eric Munn – Bishop of Caledonia, Canada
 Basil Peacey – Bishop of Lemombo, Portuguese Mozambique
 Edward Pugh – Bishop of Penrith
 Nicholas Reade – Bishop of Blackburn
 Ambrose Reeves – Bishop of Johannesburg, South Africa
 John Satterthwaite – Bishop in Europe
 Mark Sowerby – Bishop of Horsham
 Humphrey Taylor – Bishop of Selby
 Eric Trapp – Bishop of Bermuda
 Peter Wheatley – former Bishop of Edmonton
 Rowan Williams – former Archbishop of Canterbury
 Mark Wood – Bishop of Ludlow

References

External links

College website
 Community of the Resurrection website
Mirfield Centre website
Department of Biblical Studies webpage on the University of Sheffield website
Yorkshire Ministry Course website

Anglican seminaries and theological colleges
Anglo-Catholic educational establishments
Bible colleges, seminaries and theological colleges in England
Education in Kirklees
Educational institutions established in 1903
1903 establishments in England